Satka is a town and the administrative center of Satkinsky District in Chelyabinsk Oblast, Russia, located on the western slope of the Southern Ural Mountains on the bank of the Satka River,  from Chelyabinsk, the administrative center of the oblast. Population:

History
It was founded on November 19, 1758 as an iron mining factory. Magnesite, a mineral essential to the manufacture of refractory brick used in blast furnaces, was discovered there.

In the beginning of the 20th century in Satka lived up to 10 thousand people. Among them are many alien people. Reached out to work the Old Believers of different sects and persuasions (the Austrians, the Pomorians, precedency, filippovtsy, fedoseevtsy etc.). There were two churches, two schools, post office, Telegraph, hospital, consumer society, two 46 industrial and commercial enterprises.

In 1824 the city was visited by Emperor Alexander I, which has a positive impact on further development of production. By the end of the 19th century there were two blast furnaces, between the mechanical workshop and foundry in laid track.
The Soviet government inherited a large production. In 1928 Satka became an urban-type settlement, and in 1937 — a city district, and since 1957 — of regional subordination.

Administrative and municipal status
Within the framework of administrative divisions, Satka serves as the administrative center of Satkinsky District. As an administrative division, it is, together with ten rural localities, incorporated within Satkinsky District as the Town of Satka. As a municipal division, the Town of Satka is incorporated within Satkinsky Municipal District as Satkinskoye Urban Settlement.

Economy
The major industry in the town is the extraction of magnesite and other ores along with metallurgical plants to process the ore.
In the conduct of Kombinat Magnezit there is the unique current narrow gauge railroad for Russia. The expanded length of the narrow railway was about 20 kilometers. The road is completely electrified.
There is a small tourist industry because of the town's location in the center of the Ural Mountains near Zyuratkul National Park. There is also a nearby historic site at Porogi where the first hydro-electric generator in Russia was installed.

Satka has a little industry and one factory.

Transportation
Although there is a railway station in Satka, it is a spur line so connections are inconvenient.

Education
In addition to secondary schools, there is a satellite campus of the Chelyabinsk State University.

References

Notes

Sources

External links
Official website of Satka 
OAO Magnezit, the major employer in the town 

Cities and towns in Chelyabinsk Oblast
Ufa Governorate